Himsa was an American heavy metal band from Seattle, Washington. Formed in 1998, their band name is from the Sanskrit word himsa, which means "harm" or "violence".

The group released four full-length studio albums, two EPs and one DVD before their disbandment in 2008.

History
The band formed in 1998 and released an independent EP and full-length album in 1999 on Revelation Records. Before being signed to Prosthetic Records, the band released one more EP in 2001, which was also on Revelation.

2003 saw Himsa record and release their album Courting Tragedy and Disaster. Following the release of the album the band toured extensively throughout the US and other parts of the world. They spent the latter half of 2005 in Denmark, recording their follow-up album, Hail Horror.

In November 2006, Himsa announced that they have signed with Century Media Records.

On April 23, 2007, Himsa entered the studio to work on their new album, Summon in Thunder, which was released on September 18, 2007. This was their only studio album released on Century Media Records. This album added a more melodic death metal sound to the band.

In the summer of 2016 they reunited and played a few practice shows opening for other bands. They played under various names including Crushpile and Metalmucil. Their official reunion show was October 31, 2016, at El Corazon.
They are set to play Northwest Terror Fest May 31-June 2, 2018. The reunion lineup is all of the final lineup except Chad Davis on drums. John Pettibone has stated the band won't do any touring other than playing in the Seattle area.

Touring
In early 2006, Himsa toured with Darkest Hour, The Acacia Strain, A Life Once Lost, and Dead To Fall. During November 2006, Himsa toured Australia with Parkway Drive and Cry Murder.

Disbandment
Himsa advertised that their August 16, 2008, at El Corazon in Seattle was to be their last show ever.

On June 20, 2008, bassist Derek Harn issued a statement as follows:
"After 10+ years, four releases, countless tours and almost incomprehensible (yet constant) upheaval, the last three years of the band have been relatively stable. Having sacrificed everything we had in order to ensure the band's survival it's time to let it go. We made a great CD (Summon in Thunder/Century Media); reportedly, our best. We've got a great label. We're getting along, we've toured and we're fine. It's all good. We're leaving it at that."

Vocalist John Pettibone said that he will devote all his time to side bands such as The Vows and has said he is done with touring. Pettibone has since joined Seattle band Heiress, which has released a self-titled 7-inch and a split 7-inch with Narrows.

Discography 
Studio albums
Ground Breaking Ceremony (1999)
Courting Tragedy and Disaster (2003)
Hail Horror (2006)
Summon in Thunder (2007)

EPs
Himsa (1999)
Death Is Infinite (2001)

DVDs
You've Seen Too Much (2005)

Personnel

Current lineup
Derek Harn - Bass (1998–2008, 2017–present)
Kirby Charles Johnson - Guitar (2000–2008, 2017–present)
John Pettibone - Vocals (2000, 2000–2008, 2017–present)
Josh 'Sammi Curr' Freer - Guitar (2003, 2005–2008, 2017–present)
Chad Davis - Drums (2003–2007, 2017–present)

Former members
Christian Schmitt - Vocals (1998–1999)
Brian Johnson - Guitar (1998–2000, 2000–2002)
Henry - Guitar (1998–1999)
Aaron Edge - Guitar (1998–1999)
Mike Green - Drums (1998–2000)
EJ Bastien - Guitar (1999–2000, 2000)
Chris LaPointe - Vocals (2000)
Tim Mullen - Drums (2000–2003)
Clay Layton - Guitar, Samples (2000–2001)
Matt Wicklund - Guitar (2003, 2003–2005)
Joe Frothingham - Drums (2007–2008)

Timeline

References

Metalcore musical groups from Washington (state)
American melodic death metal musical groups
American deathcore musical groups
Musical groups from Seattle
Musical groups established in 1998
Musical groups disestablished in 2008
Musical groups reestablished in 2017